The Lexington Barbecue Festival is a one-day food festival held each October in Lexington, North Carolina, the "Barbecue Capital of the World."  Each year it attracts as many as 200,000 visitors to the uptown Lexington area to sample the different foods from up to 20 different area restaurants, dozens of visiting food vendors, and hundreds of other vendors.

The annual event is listed in the book 1000 Places to See in the USA & Canada Before-You-Die, a part of the series based on the best-selling 1,000 Places to See Before You Die.  In 2012, the U.S. News & World Report ranked Lexington as #4 on its list of the best cities for barbecue.

History

The idea for an annual festival was first brought up in 1983 by Joe Sink, Jr., publisher of Lexington's daily newspaper, The Dispatch. He approached the bank BB&T, which agreed to look into the idea and hired Kay Saintsing, a local organization developer and manager, to conduct a study of the feasibility of such a festival. The investigation concluded that the festival was a valid idea, as Lexington was already a popular weekend destination for barbecue, and the first festival was held October 27, 1984.

The Lexington Barbecue Festival was to become one of the nation's most popular food festivals. The first festival attracted 30,000 people, and the barbecue chefs cooked 3,000 pounds of barbecue to meet demand;  by 1994, attendance had risen to over 100,000, and 11,000 pounds of meat were cooked. In 1995, the North Carolina Championship Pork Cook-Off was held in conjunction with the festival, allowing visitors from the Piedmont to watch whole-hog cooking experts from the eastern part of the state demonstrate their methods.

The festival is held each October in uptown Lexington. Several city blocks on main street, are closed to vehicle traffic for the event. Besides barbecue, there are typically over 400 other vendors of arts and crafts, homemade fudge and other wares. Over the years, sponsors have included Childress Vineyards, Pepsi, BB&T, Walmart, and other large and local corporations.

When the festival first started in 1984, the participants were primarily local restaurants and a few local merchants. Since then it has grown to hundreds of vendors displaying every type of product. While the primary focus is still the barbecue, a large number of merchants sell other items that are unique to the area. Some of the more notable restaurants participating include Jimmy's Barbecue (now defunct) and Stamey's Barbecue.

There'll be smaller activities and many events that may be virtual in 2020, caused by the COVID-19 pandemic.

25th Anniversary

The 25th Anniversary Lexington Barbecue Festival was held on Saturday, October 25, 2008. The anniversary event included a 50-ton sand sculpture featuring pigs on a cake, six musical acts, an antique car show, arts and crafts, BMX biking, and other events.  

Musical acts included General Johnson and Chairmen of the Board, Lee Ann Womack, Adam Gregory, Randy Houser, and Jamey Johnson, as well as regional and local performers.

For this event and in following years, Amtrak provided a special one-day stop in Lexington for riders from nearby Charlotte and Raleigh North Carolina.

The overall turnout was approximately 100,000 people, down from the 150,000 that came in 2007.  Rain and the 2008 economic recession were cited as likely reasons for the lower turnout.

"Pork-Barrel Politics"
While the focus of the festival is Lexington style barbecue, several vendors of the eastern variety can also be found, sparking mild (and sometimes not so mild) controversy.  The battle of Lexington style vs. eastern style has even gone as far as the state government.  In 2006, North Carolina House Bill 21 and North Carolina Senate Bill 47 were introduced and would have made the Lexington Barbecue Festival the official barbecue festival of North Carolina.  A separate amended bill, North Carolina House Bill suggested making the Lexington Barbecue Festival the official food festival of North Carolina.  Neither garnered enough support to pass, as nearly half of the state favors the eastern style barbecue, sparking genuine controversy about the bill incidentally creating an "official state barbecue" (as opposed to just the festival) with either Lexington or eastern style.

One example of the more light-hearted feud that exists between the proponents of the two types of barbecue is when author Jerry Bledsoe, the self-professed "world's leading, foremost barbecue authority." claimed that Dennis Rogers, (columnist for The Raleigh News & Observer and self-professed "oracle of the holy grub.") "has ruined any chances of this state being distinguished in its barbecue."  While a degree of humor is involved, choice of barbecue type is a politically charged topic.

Official status
In 2007, NC House Bill 433 passed, granting the Lexington Barbecue Festival the  title "Official Food Festival of the Piedmont Triad Region of the State of North Carolina".  By excluding the eastern part of the state when making an official designation, they effectively bypassed any controversy regarding eastern barbecue and avoided any style of barbecue being considered the "official" barbecue for the State of North Carolina.

Other activities
Some of the other activities include lumberlack games, live music from up to five different stages, and street performers.

See also
 Pigs in the City
 North Carolina Barbecue Society
 Regional variations of barbecue
 List of North Carolina-related topics
 Lexington station (North Carolina)
 List of festivals in North Carolina

References

External links
Official website
Lexington Tourism Authority
Stamey's Barbecue
Official list of barbecue restaurants in Davidson County
North Carolina Barbecue Society

Barbecue
Festivals in North Carolina
Tourist attractions in Davidson County, North Carolina
Food and drink festivals in the United States
Annual events in North Carolina
Recurring events established in 1984
1984 establishments in North Carolina